Atghoria( or আটঘরিয়া) is an upazila of Pabna District in Rajshahi Division, Bangladesh.

History
A fierce battle was fought in 1971 between the Pak army and the freedom fighters at the Kalamnagor Ghat on river Chandrabati of Majpara Union. Md Anwar Hossain led the battle on the Mukti Bahini side. Sixteen local villagers joined this battle.  In this battle 12 freedom fighters and 10 villagers were killed. The Pakistan army lost their commander, Captain Tahir. A foundation has been built to pay respect to all these great heroes including 10 village fighters. The Kalamnagor Muktijoddha Ghat is now a historical place. Daily, 50 to 100 people come to visit the place.

Geography
Atgharia Upazila with an area of 186.15 km2 is bounded by Baraigram, Chatmohar and Faridpur upazilas on the north, Pabna Sadar upazila on the south, Santhia upazila on the east and Ishwardi upazilas on the west. Main rivers are Chiknai, Ratnai and Chandrabati; Purulia and Sutir Beels are notable. It has 22339 households and total area 186.15 km2.

Demographics
As of the 1991 Bangladesh census, Atgharia has a population of 124454. Males constitute 51.41% of the population, and females 48.59%. This Upazila's eighteen up population is 59721. Atgharia has an average literacy rate of 21.7% (7+ years), and the national average of 32.4% literate.

Atgharia (Town) located at Debattar, consists of four mouzas. The area of the town is 5.93 km2. The town has a population of 5164; male 50.37%, female 49.63%. The density of population is 871 per km2.

Administration
Administration Atgharia thana was turned into an upazila in 1983.

Atgharia Upazila is divided into Atgharia Municipality and five union parishads: Chandba, Debottar, Ekdanta, Lakshmipur, and Majhpara. The union parishads are subdivided into 111 mauzas and 122 villages.

Atgharia Municipality is subdivided into 9 wards and 18 mahallas.

 Chairman:Tanvirul Islam
 Vice Chairman: Abdus Sattar Mohammad Sohel
 Woman Vice Chairman: Meherun Nessa
 Upazila Nirbahi Officer (UNO): Syed Robiul Islam

Education
Average literacy rate 21.07%; male 26.4% and female 16.8%. Educational institution: College 5, secondary school 15, madrasa 18, government primary school 44, non-government primary school 29. Noted educational institutions: Ramchandrapur High School, Atgharia Pilot Model High School, Debattar Pilot Girls' High School, Sahid Abdul Khaleque High School, B.L.K High school, Khidirpur high school, Parkhidirpur high school, Ekdanta High School, Lakshmipur High School, Debattar Model Government Primary School (1880), Shibpur Madrassa.

Notable persons
 Lutfor Rahman, cardiac surgeon, spent most of his childhood in Atgharia village.

See also
Upazilas of Bangladesh
Districts of Bangladesh
Divisions of Bangladesh

References

Upazilas of Pabna District